Zakka Nyam, consecrated in 1998,  is an Anglican bishop in Nigeria: he is the current Bishop of Kano, one of ten dioceses within the Anglican Province of Kaduna, itself one of 14 provinces within the Church of Nigeria.

Notes

Living people
Anglican bishops of Kano
21st-century Anglican bishops in Nigeria
20th-century Anglican bishops in Nigeria
Year of birth missing (living people)